Awkward & Depressed is the third studio album by internet comedian Jarrod Alonge, released under the moniker of his fictitious emo band Canadian Softball, on July 28, 2017. The album primarily satirizes and parodies tropes found in the emo genre, primarily from the early 2010s emo revival. The album directly parodies bands such as American Football, Modern Baseball, Hawthorne Heights and Hotel Books. The album also features a cover of "Seven" by Sunny Day Real Estate, a first for Alonge.

Background
Similar to Alonge's previous releases, Awkward & Depressed was crowdfunded through an Indiegogo campaign, which raised over $26,000. The album and crowdfunding campaign were announced on March 10 with the release of the "Fund Me" music video. Campaign perks included a signed poster, a CD and digital download of the album, a T-shirt and hat, and a wall flag. While recording the album, Alonge released the EPs Covers, Vol. 1 and No Words Spoken by his non-comedic post-hardcore project CrazyEightyEight.

On July 7, 2017, Alonge released an official trailer for the album, revealing a 13-song track list with a sample for each song. The trailer revealed that the album would contain a cover of Sunny Day Real Estate's "Seven" along with Hotel Books providing guest vocals on the song "Cut the Cord." "Your Validation" was the first song to be released from the album, with the music video premiering on YouTube on July 14. A lyric video for the song "Ohio Is for Emo Kids" was released on July 21. The album's second music video, "Great Again," was released on July 27, a day before the album's release.

Music and lyrics
The album's first track, "Average Joe," mimics emo bands' tendency to write songs about being an "average person" and complaining about being unpopular despite being signed to a record label and having many fans. In reference to the song, Alonge stated that he was "essentially just a poor man's Bert McCracken." The song "Your Validation" is a parody of Modern Baseball with the song's name referencing their song "Your Graduation" from the album You're Gonna Miss It All. The song describes various scene phases a person goes through with the music video showing pictures of fellow YouTube comedian/musician Jared Dines going through a hardcore punk phase, an emo phase, and a scene phase, among others. The next song, "Mathematical," is a parody of American Football and math rock with the song featuring many time and tempo changes. The song becomes more chaotic as it goes on before Alonge stops it and refers to it as "musical gibberish." The title of "Great Again" is a reference to Donald Trump's campaign slogan of "Make America great again" from the 2016 presidential election. The song's lyrics glamorize American life in the 1950s, such as graduating from college debt free with a high-paying job, normalized homophobia, and calling the cops on an African-American man for no reason. The track is done in the style of The Wonder Years and the name likely references their album The Greatest Generation. The track "Mumble" features Alonge unintelligibly mumbling throughout the song with lyrics featuring communist propaganda. "Lysergide" is a shoegaze-influenced song reminiscent of new Title Fight material as well as dream-pop band Turnover with the lyrics describing a drug trip with the vocals becoming distorted near the end.

The song "Seven" is a straightforward cover of the song originally by Sunny Day Real Estate. The title of the song "Peev Shalpatine" is a reference to the Star Wars character Sheev Palpatine. The song's lyrics predominately feature Alonge re-enacting "The Tragedy of Darth Plagueis the Wise" from Star Wars Episode III: Revenge of the Sith in the style of spoken word emo/post-hardcore bands like Hotel Books, Listener, and La Dispute. The song was originally written by Johnny Franck for his musical project Bilmuri, but didn't end up on the album and was instead given to Jarrod. The next song, "Weebi FM," is a post-hardcore parody in the style of Hawthorne Heights with the song's title being a reference to "Niki FM". The song's lyrics describe a young man that has been friend zoned by a girl despite being nice toward her and his distress over it. "Cut the Cord" features guest vocals from Hotel Books. The lyrics are seemingly about a man ending a relationship with a person before it is revealed at the end that he is actually ending his cable services with Comcast. "United We Skramz" is a screamo song in the style of Pg. 99. The song begins with an audio clip of Donald Trump saying that no other president has been treated as badly as he has while the lyrics reference the assassinations of John F. Kennedy, James Garfield, and Abraham Lincoln. This clip references the Nirvana clip in the intro of Pg. 99's song "In Love With an Apparition." "Ohio Is for Emo Kids" is a medley consisting of parody snippets of twenty different pop punk, post-hardcore, and alternative rock songs. In addition to focusing on the songs' melodramatic nature (referencing things such as suicide, being bullied, losing a job, and missing a concert), the song also lampoons their often erroneous association with the emo genre, making reference to proper emo acts such as Jawbreaker, Rites of Spring, Sunny Day Real Estate, and Pinkerton-era Weezer. The song ends with the opening riff from "The Words 'Best Friend' Become Redefined" by Chiodos before it is abruptly cut-off with Alonge stating that the song is running too long. The song's title is a reference to "Ohio Is for Lovers" by Hawthorne Heights. The album's final song, "Pink Wednesday," is an acoustic rock song in the style of Tigers Jaw with lyrics inspired by the 2004 film Mean Girls.

Track listing

Personnel
Canadian Softball
 Jarrod Alonge – vocals, guitar, drum programming, primary songwriting, production

Additional personnel
 Hotel Books – vocals on track 10
 Mike Martenson – unclean vocals on tracks 9 and 12, vocal editing on tracks 1, 2, 4, 9 and 13
 Johnny Franck – production, mixing, engineering, mastering
 Dylan Werle – vocal editing on track 12
 Rob Alley – vocal tracking on track 15
 David Leøng – artwork

Chart performance

Notes

References

2017 albums
Jarrod Alonge albums